With the Mounted Police is a 1912 American silent short romantic thriller film written by Lloyd Lonergan. The films stars  William Garwood as a Mounted Police Officer and Mignon Anderson his sweetheart.

External links

1912 films
1910s romantic thriller films
American romantic thriller films
American silent short films
American black-and-white films
Thanhouser Company films
1910s American films
Silent thriller films